

References

Ideal SC players
Montserratian footballers
Montserrat international footballers
1980 births
Living people
Association football goalkeepers